Gertrud Maria Åström (born 28 July 1954 in Bodträsk in Kalix) is a Swedish business and organization leader. She was President of the Swedish Women's Lobby from 2009 to 2015. Gertrud Åström previously served as CEO of the publishing company Ordfront. In 2004 she was appointed by the Government of Sweden as a special rapporteur on gender equality policies.

References

Swedish feminists
1954 births
Living people